ISO 22315:2014 Societal security – Mass evacuation – Guidelines for planning, is an international standard developed by ISO/TC 292 Security and resilience and published by the International Organization for Standardization in 2014. ISO 22315 gives various of recommendations on how to plan for possible mass evacuations, for example a city. The standard includes guidance on the various phases of mass evacutation from how to prepare the public, take the decision for evacuation to analyzing the evacuee movement and assessing the shelter where the evacuees is put.

Scope and contents 
ISO 22315 includes the following main clauses:
 Scope
 Normative references
 Terms and definitions
 General aspects for mass evacuation planning 
 Prepare the public for mass evacuation 
 Visualize the areas that are at risk or affected 
 Make the evacuation decision 
 Public warning
 Analyse evacuee movement 
 Assess evacuee shelter requirements

Related standards
ISO 22315 is part of a series of standards on Community resilience. The other standards are: 
 ISO 22319:2017 Security and resilience – Community resilience – Guidelines for planning the involvement of spontaneous volunteers
 ISO 22392:2020 Security and resilience – Community resilience – Guidelines for conducting peer reviews
 ISO 22395:2018 Security and resilience – Community resilience – Guidelines for supporting vulnerable persons in an emergency
 ISO 22396:2020 Security and resilience – Community resilience – Guidelines for information exchange between organisations

History

See also 
 List of ISO standards
 International Organization for Standardization

References

External links 
 ISO 22315— Societal security – Mass evacuation – Guidelines for planning
 ISO TC 292— Security and resilience
 ISO 22315 at www.isotc292online.org

22315